Emina Haračič (born 8 July 1995) is a Slovenian rhythmic gymnast.

References

Slovenian rhythmic gymnasts
Living people
1995 births